This page includes a list of biblical proper names that start with S in English transcription. Some of the names are given with a proposed etymological meaning. For further information on the names included on the list, the reader may consult the sources listed below in the References and External Links.

A – B – C – D – E – F – G – H – I – J – K – L – M – N – O – P – Q – R – S – T – U – V – Y – Z

S

Sabaoth
Sabaeans
Sabtah
Sabtechah
Sacar
Sachia
Sadducees
Sadoc
Sakia
Salah
Salamis
Salathiel
Salcah
Salem
Salim
Sallai
Salma
Salmon
Salome
Samaria
Samlah
Samos
Samothracia
Samson
Samuel
Sanballat
Sanhedrin
Sansannah
Saph
Saphir
Sapphira
Sarah
Sarai
Sardis
Sardites
Sarepta
Sargon
Sarid
Saron
Sarsechim
Saruch
Satan
Saul
Sceva
Seba
Sebat
Sebia
Secacah
Sechu
Secundus
Segub
Seir
Sela
Sela-hammahlekoth
Selah
Seled
Seleucia
Sem
Semachiah
Semei
Senaah
Seneh
Senir
Sennacherib
Seorim
Sephar
Sepharad
Sepharvaim
Serah
Seraiah
Seraphim
Sered
Sergius
Serug
Seth
Sethur
Shaalabbin
Shaalbim
Shaalbonites
Shaaph
Shaaraim
Shaashgaz
Shabbethai
Shachia
Shadrach
Shage
Shalem
Shalim
Shalisha
Shallum
Shalmai
Shalman
Shalmaneser
Shamariah
Shamayim
Shamer
Shamgar
Shamhuth
Shamir
Shammah
Shammai
Shammoth
Shammua
Shamsherai
Shapham
Shaphat
Sharai
Sharar
Sharezer
Sharon
Shashai
Shashak
Shaul
Shaveh Kiriathaim
Shaveh, valley of
Shealtiel
Sheariah
Shear-jashub
Sheba
Shebam
Shebaniah
Shebarim
Sheber
Shebna
Shebuel
Shecaniah
Shechem
Shedeur
Shehariah
Shelah
Shelemiah
Sheleph
Shelesh
Shelomi
Shelumiel
Shem
Shema
Shemaiah
Shemariah
Shemeber
Shemed
Shemer
Shemida
Sheminith
Shemiramoth
Shemuel
Shen
Shenazar
Shenir
Shephatiah
Shephi
Shepho
Shephuphan
Sherah
Sherebiah
Sheshach
Sheshai
Sheshan
Sheshbazzar
Shethar
Shethar-boznai
Sheva
Shibboleth
Shibmah
Shicron
Shiggaion
Shihon, sound
Shihor-libnah
Shilhi
Shillem
Shiloah
Shiloh
Shiloh (name of a city)
Shilom
Shilshah
Shimeah
Shimei
Shimeon
Shimma
Shimon
Shimrath
Shimshai
Shimri
Shimrith
Shinab
Shinar
Shiphi
Shiphrah
Shisha
Shishak
Shitrai
Shittim
Shiza
Shoa
Shobab
Shobach
Shobai
Shobal
Shobek
Shochoh
Shoham
Shomer
Shophach
Shophan
Shoshannim
Shua
Shuah
Shual
Shubael
Shuham
Shulamite
Shunem
Shuni
Shuphim
Shur
Shushan
Shuthelah
Sia
Sibbechai
Sibmah
Sichem
Siddim
Sidon
Sigionoth
Sihon
Sihor
Silas
Silla
Siloa
Silvanus
Simeon
Simon
Sin
Sinai
Sinim
Sion
Sippai
Sinon
Sisamai
Sisera
Sitnah
Sivan
Smyrna
So
Socoh
Sodi
Sodom
Solomon
Sopater
Sophereth
Sorek
Sosthenes
Sotai
Spain
Stachys
Stephanas
Stephen
Asher
Abishai
Arashel
Suah
Succoth
Succoth-benoth
Sud
Sur
Susanna
Susi
Sychar
Syene
Syntyche
Syracuse

References
Comay, Joan,jj,* Who's Who in the Old Testament, Oxford University Press, 1971,  
Lockyer, Herbert, All the men of the Bible, Zondervan Publishing House (Grand Rapids, Michigan), 1958
Lockyer, Herbert, All the women of the Bible, Zondervan Publishing 1988, 
Lockyer, Herbert, All the Divine Names and Titles in the Bible, Zondervan Publishing 1988,  
Tischler, Nancy M., All things in the Bible: an encyclopedia of the biblical world , Greenwood Publishing, Westport, Conn. : 2006 
unique, boy, names, Christian names with s, 2022, here

Inline references 

S